The Prophecy Fulfilled is the second EP from metal band Darkest Hour and was released on May 20, 1999. It was the band's last EP, before their debut album The Mark of the Judas.

Track listing

Reception

Allmusic stated, "Heavier than real heavy…things, crushing highlights such as 'The Choir of Prophecy Fulfilled' and 'This Side of the Nightmare' basked in uncompromisingly ruthless death metal ferocity, while the slower passages heard on 'Reflections of Ruin' and the especially malevolent 'This Curse' were reminiscent of punishing Southern sludgecore."

Personnel
Darkest Hour
 John Henry – vocals, organ, keyboards, piano
 Mike Schleibaum – guitars
 Billups Allen  – bass
 Matt Mabben – drums

Production
Produced by Darkest Hour and Ken Olden
Bruce Falkinburg – engineer
Ben Mellot – engineer (tracks 3 and 6)
Rob Christensen – mastering
Issa Diao – editing

References

Darkest Hour (band) EPs
1999 EPs